Ellwood City is a borough primarily in Lawrence County, Pennsylvania, United States, with a small district in Beaver County. The population was 7,031 at the 2020 census. In the past, Ellwood City sustained many heavy industries such as steel tube mills, steel car works, building stone and limestone quarries, foundries and machine shops, and coal mining.

Geography
Ellwood City is located at  (40.860983, -80.284849).

The (roughly) 0.3 mile-diameter Pittsburgh Circle within the city was once a bicycle-racing track, as the city historically manufactured steel for bicycles.

Demographics

As of the census of 2000, there were 8,688 people, 3,716 households, and 2,393 families residing in the borough. The population density was 3,716.6 people per square mile (1,433.5/km2). There were 4,006 housing units at an average density of 1,713.7 per square mile (661.0/km2). The racial makeup of the borough was 98.22% White, 0.81% African American, 0.09% Native American, 0.23% Asian, 0.18% from other races, and 0.47% from two or more races. Hispanic or Latino of any race were 0.60% of the population.

There were 3,716 households, out of which 26.6% had children under the age of 18 living with them, 47.3% were married couples living together, 12.6% had a female householder with no husband present, and 35.6% were non-families. Of all households, 32.3% were made up of individuals, and 18.2% had someone living alone who was 65 years of age or older. The average household size was 2.32 and the average family size was 2.94.

In the borough the population was spread out, with 22.5% under the age of 18, 7.7% from 18 to 24, 26.5% from 25 to 44, 21.2% from 45 to 64, and 22.1% who were 65 years of age or older. The median age was 41 years. For every 100 females, there were 86.9 males. For every 100 females age 18 and over, there were 83.4 males.

The median income for a household in the borough was $28,926, and the median income for a family was $40,758. Males had a median income of $31,703 versus $21,285 for females. The per capita income for the borough was $15,784. About 8.6% of families and 12.3% of the population were below the poverty line, including 15.9% of those under age 18 and 11.1% of those age 65 or over.

The population at the 2010 census was 7,921, a change of -8.8% since 2000. There were 3,721 males (47.0%) and 4,200 females (53.0%). The median age was 42.0 years, compared to 40.1 for the state of Pennsylvania.

The estimated median household income in 2007 was $35,555 (it was $28,926 in 2000), while in Pennsylvania it was $48,576. Estimated per capita income in 2007 was $18,674 in Ellwood City, versus $26,228 for the entire state. Estimated median house or condo value in 2007 was $91,245 (it was $75,700 in 2000), versus $155,000 for the state.

Notable people

 Jim Gerlach, (b 1955) is the former U.S. Representative for Pennsylvania's 6th congressional district.
 Princess Ileana of Romania, (1909–1991), was the youngest daughter of King Ferdinand I of Romania and his consort, Queen Marie of Romania. 
 Donnie Iris, (b 1943) is a rock musician known for his work with the Jaggerz and Wild Cherry.
 Sean Miller, (b 1968) is a men's college basketball coach for Xavier University.
 Matt Osborne, (1957–2013), was a WWF/WWE professional wrestler, known professionally as "Doink the Clown".
 Leslie H. Sabo, Jr., (1948–1970) Vietnam War hero; posthumously received the Medal of Honor after 40-year lag period
 Debra Todd,(b 1957) is a justice of the Supreme Court of Pennsylvania. Pennsylvania State Supreme Court justice
 Hack Wilson, (1900–1948) was a Baseball Hall of Fame player for the Chicago Cubs.
 George Zeber,  (b 1950) is a former professional baseball player for the New York Yankees.

In popular culture
The PBS Kids TV series Arthur takes place in a fictional town of Elwood City (note the lack of the second L in this name), which has a remarkably similar geography and topography to its namesake. Also of noted coincidence is the town of Crown City often mentioned in the show (a town distant from Elwood City and accessed on the show by either bus or train ride): in real life, there is a town 190 miles southwest in Ohio named Crown City along the Ohio River, 15 miles northeast of Huntington, West Virginia, although not as populated or having as many resources as the fictional version.

References

External links
 
 Ellwood City Area Chamber of Commerce
 Ellwood City community website
 Photos of the Ellwood steel mill
 Elwood City Ledger

Pittsburgh metropolitan area
Boroughs in Beaver County, Pennsylvania
Boroughs in Lawrence County, Pennsylvania
1892 establishments in Pennsylvania
Populated places established in 1892